Jon L. Borchardt (born August 13, 1957 in Minneapolis, Minnesota) is a former professional American football guard in the National Football League who played for the Buffalo Bills and Seattle Seahawks. He played college football at Montana State University.

1957 births
Living people
American football offensive guards
Montana State Bobcats football players
Buffalo Bills players
Seattle Seahawks players
Players of American football from Minneapolis